Roee Avraham (born 17 February 1996 in Ramat Gan) is an Israeli professional squash player. As of February 2018, he was ranked number 171 in the world and number 1 in Israel.

References

1996 births
Living people
Israeli male squash players
Sportspeople from Ramat Gan